Richard Howitt (21 July 1864 Farnsfield Grange, Nottinghamshire, England-10 January 1951 Farndon, Nottinghamshire, England) was an English cricketer who played first-class cricket for Nottinghamshire from 1893 to 1901.

Cricket career
Howitt made his first-class debut in a match versus the Marylebone Cricket Club (MCC) in May, 1893. His top score of 119 was in a County Championship match for Nottinghamshire against Sussex in May, 1895.

References

1864 births
1951 deaths
Cricketers from Nottinghamshire
English cricketers
Nottinghamshire cricketers
People from Newark and Sherwood (district)